Yepton's (also known as Yepton or Yeptons) is a settlement in Saint John Parish, Antigua and Barbuda.

Etymology 
Yepton's Estates name is thought to have come from the Sussex, England, town of Yapton, which lies close to the city of Arundel. Yapton-born Sir George Thomas acquired ownership of the plantation around 1800.

History

Yepton's Estate 
George Thomas, the Leeward Islands' governor from 1753 to 1766, was granted the Thomas Baronetcy of Yapton in the County of Sussex in 1790. After the seventh Baronet, a well-known chess player, passed away in 1972, the title was abolished. The same was granted to Thomas Edwards and his heirs in fee simple of the plantation therein mentioned for the sum of 22,000 pounds to be paid as follows in 1802, according to an indenture between Sir George Thomas and his son. When George White-Thomas inherited Yapton from his grandfather, Sir George Thomas (d. 1821), he adopted the name Thomas, and Yapton now serves as his memorial cemetery.

Messrs. Hyndman, who owned Yapton in 1829, also owned a number of other estates on Antigua, including Bendalls (#37), 503 acres, Towerhill, 361 acres, Belevedere, 343 acres, Yapton Farm, 888 acres, Mathew's or Constitution Hill (#132), 158 acres, Elmes, and Sawcolt's, all of which were owned by Warrick P. Hyndman in 1852. 

Yepton's received a legacy payment of £1,681. 4s. 1p. for freeing 113 slaves when slavery was outlawed by the British Parliament in 1833. Boyd Alexander, Claude Neilson, and William Maxwell Alexander received the honor. Robert Hyndman was unsuccessful, and the Honorable William Fraser was involved.

Alex Coltart, owner of Harney & Coltart, a company that minted farthing coins—a quarter of a penny in British currency—for the collecting of salt from the surrounding salt ponds, was the apparent owner of Yepton's in the 1850s (although he is officially documented as gaining possession in 1878). The only supply of salt today is in Barbuda, where it is harvested during the dry months and kept in sizable barrels for local consumption. As was previously mentioned, various ponds in Antigua once produced salt that was harvested in baskets.

The Yepton's pond behind Deep Bay was a valuable supply of salt in the mid-1800s and well into the early 1900s. It was a coarse-grained kind that was perfect for creating ice cream or salting fresh dishes. A short passage at the northern end of the pond was used to bring sea water, and it was kept from draining during the hot, dry months so that the sun's rays could evaporate the sea water, leaving behind a layer of salt crystals. Village ladies from Five Islands and neighboring villages would gather the salt at the conclusion of the drying season. For each basket of salt they delivered, Harney & Coltart paid them with farthings. These tiny coins are occasionally discovered and brought to the Antigua & Barbuda Museum.

Demographics 
Yepton's has one enumeration district, ED 36100 (Yepton’s).

Yepton's had a Living Conditions Index of 18.2 in August 2007, among the highest in the country.

Historically, Yepton's has had a population of 114 in 2001, and 122 in 1991.

2011 Population and Housing Census Data

Tourist attractions 

 Yepton, a beach, is located in the village. "A gorgeous and relaxing area being not widely recognized among travelers," is how it is described. There are a few further tiny beaches nearby that are accessible on foot.

References 

Saint John Parish, Antigua and Barbuda
Populated places in Antigua and Barbuda